Parabisternalis is a genus of mites in the family Laelapidae.

Species
 Parabisternalis yemeni Ueckermann & Loots, 1995

References

Laelapidae